Freudy Cat is a 1964 Warner Bros. Looney Tunes animated short directed by Robert McKimson. The short was released on March 14, 1964, and stars Sylvester the Cat, Sylvester Jr. and Hippety Hopper.

A paranoid Sylvester flashes back to earlier cartoons such as Who's Kitten Who?, Cats A-Weigh!, and The Slap-Hoppy Mouse while describing to a psychiatrist that he thinks Hippety Hopper is out to get him.

Soundtrack Anomaly
The cartoon is unusual in that it mixes a new soundtrack by Bill Lava with music by Carl Stalling (while alive in 1964, he had retired six years earlier), which is heard during the original shorts that make up this cartoon. That results in a schizophrenic soundtrack (whether this was intentional, given the plot of a mentally unbalanced Sylvester visiting a psychiatrist, isn't known, but it is possible). Even more unusual is that certain prints of the cartoon contain stock music pieces by Philip Green that play over numerous areas of the cartoon without removing the old soundtrack, creating a rather dissonant, overbearing "new" soundtrack.

Notes
 This was the last theatrical appearance of both Hippety Hopper and Sylvester Jr.

References

1964 films
1964 animated films
1964 short films
1960s Warner Bros. animated short films
Looney Tunes shorts
Sylvester the Cat films
Films about father–son relationships
Animated films about kangaroos and wallabies
Films directed by Robert McKimson
Films scored by Carl Stalling
Films scored by William Lava
Warner Bros. Cartoons animated short films
1960s English-language films
Hippety Hopper films